

Plants

Angiosperms

Arthropods

insects

Archosauromorphs

Crurotarsans

Dinosaurs
Data from George Olshevky's dinosaur genera list.

Plesiosaurs

New taxa

Synapsids

Non-mammalian

References

1940s in paleontology
Paleontology
Paleontology 0